Goris Municipality, referred to as Goris Community ( Goris Hamaynk), is an urban community and administrative subdivision of Syunik Province of Armenia, at the south of the country. Consisted of a group of settlements, its administrative centre is the town of Goris.

Included settlements

See also
Syunik Province

References

Communities in Syunik Province
2016 establishments in Armenia